The Adzva is a river in Komi Republic, Russia. It is a right tributary of the Usa.

References 

Rivers of the Komi Republic
Rivers of Nenets Autonomous Okrug